Belnəng (Belneng, Bəlnəng, Belning, Bɨlnɨng) is a West Chadic language of Shendam LGA, Plateau State, Nigeria closely related to Angas. It is spoken by about 500 people in the single village of Langung, which is surrounded by Tal villages in the east and Miship villages in the west (Blench 2017). It is documented in Blench & Bulkaam (2019).

Lexicon
Some Belneng names of plants and animals:

References

West Chadic languages
Languages of Nigeria